The 2022–23 New Hampshire Wildcats men's basketball team represented the University of New Hampshire in the 2022–23 NCAA Division I men's basketball season. The Wildcats, led by 18th-year head coach Bill Herrion, played their home games at the Lundholm Gym in Durham, New Hampshire as members of the America East Conference.

Previous season
The Wildcats finished the 2021–22 season 15-13, 10-8 in America East Play to finish a tie for 2nd place. They lost in the quarterfinals of the America East tournament to Binghamton.

Roster

Schedule and results

|-
!colspan=12 style=| Non-conference regular season

|-
!colspan=12 style=| America East regular season

|-
!colspan=12 style=| America East tournament

Sources

References

New Hampshire Wildcats men's basketball seasons
New Hampshire Wildcats
New Hampshire Wildcats men's basketball
New Hampshire Wildcats men's basketball